Øst-Telemark Automobilselskap AS (ØTA) is a defunct bus company based in Notodden, Norway. It was taken over by NSB Biltrafikk on 1 May 1998, and was renamed Nettbuss Telemark AS in 2000. In 2005 it was merged into Nettbuss Drammen.

On 4 August 1997, it launched the TIMEkspressen hourly coach service from Notodden to Oslo. Nettbuss later made this a national brand for its hourly intercity coach services. In 1998, the company's owners, Gjermund Jamtveit and Halvor Grene, also started the train company TIMEtoget, that attempted to operate the Bratsberg Line on a similar, hourly concept.

References

Companies based in Vestfold og Telemark
Transport companies disestablished in 2005
Hjartdal
Notodden
Bus companies of Vestfold og Telemark
Transport companies established in 1908
Former subsidiaries of Vy Buss
1908 establishments in Norway
2005 disestablishments in Norway
Defunct bus companies of Norway